Deseret is a census-designated place in Millard County, Utah, United States. The population was 353 at the 2010 census. The name Deseret comes from the Book of Mormon.

Climate
Deseret has a cold semi-arid climate (Köppen BSk) with hot summers and cold winters.

Demographics

As of the census of 2010, there were 353 people living in the CDP. There were 124 housing units. The racial makeup of the town was 97.7% White, 1.4% American Indian and Alaska Native, 0.3% Native Hawaiian and Other Pacific Islander, and 0.6% from two or more races. Hispanic or Latino of any race were 2.3% of the population.

See also

 List of census-designated places in Utah

References

External links

Census-designated places in Millard County, Utah
Census-designated places in Utah
Great Basin National Heritage Area